Saurauia cauliflora is a species of plant in the Actinidiaceae family. It is endemic to Java, Indonesia.

It is a vulnerable species threatened by habitat loss.

References

cauliflora
Endemic flora of Java
Endangered plants
Taxonomy articles created by Polbot